Dimitrios Ploumis (in ) or, according to his episcopal name, Dimitrios of France, born November 6, 1979, in Thessaloniki, is a theologian, bishop of the Ecumenical Patriarchate and finally Metropolitan of France from 2021 onwards.

He presides over the Assembly of Orthodox Bishops of France, the coordinating body for the Orthodox faithful in France.

Biography 
He was born in Thessaloniki in 1979. He graduated from the Ecclesiastical School of Thessaloniki and from the Department of Theology of the Theological School of the Aristotle University of Thessaloniki. In 2001 he was ordained deacon and in 2007 he became priestly leader of the Church of Saint Paraskeva in Xirokrini, Thessaloniki. From 2007 to 2015, he took charge of the Church of the Exaltation of the Holy Cross in Oraiokastro, in the Metropolis of Neapolis and Stavroupolis. At the invitation of Metropolitan Emmanuel of France, he directed the Orthodox Church of Marseille and then became hierarchical commissioner of the South of France. He participated in the Commissions for inter-Christian dialogue and inter-religious relations, representing the Metropolis of France and the Ecumenical Patriarchate.

Metropolitan of France 
On July 20, 2021, he was elected by the Holy Synod of the Ecumenical Patriarchate as Metropolitan of France, he was ordained bishop by the Ecumenical Patriarch Bartholomew on the 25th of the same month in the patriarchal cathedral Saint-George at Phanar and he was enthroned on Saturday September 18, 2021 in the Saint-Étienne cathedral in Paris.

Statements and takes 
In April 2022, during the 2022 French presidential election, he joined a message from Secours Catholique calling not to support the candidacy of the far-right politician Marine Le Pen.

In September 2022, he created an internal commission of inquiry following the revelation of facts of sexual assault on minors and child sexual abuse in a monastery under his jurisdiction during the 1970s. The prelate noted that the perpetrators of the crimes were deceased and the facts prescribed but expressed to the victims his "deep horror at the horrors suffered and the suffering endured since". He offered them, if they wished, to meet him. He stated that those responsible had dishonored their office.

On February 22, 2023, he dined, in the company of sixteen other religious leaders as well as philosophers, with French President Emmanuel Macron, to discuss the question of euthanasia.

Notes and references 

1979 births
Living people
Eastern Orthodox Christians from Greece
Clergy from Thessaloniki